Hanburia may refer to:

Hanburia (plant), a genus of plants in the family Cucurbitaceae
Hanburia (trilobite), a genus of trilobites in the order Corynexochida